Basera is an Indian soap opera that aired on NDTV Imagine. It aired from 17 August 2009 to 3 December 2009 and starred Ram Kapoor and Pallavi Subhash.

Plot 

The story is how old couples are treated in many families; how they cope with disregard from their children; and how they come out strong from the challenges thrown at them by life.

Cast

References

External links
 Official website

Imagine TV original programming
2009 Indian television series endings
2009 Indian television series debuts